Dolls of Death is a 1920 German silent crime film directed by Reinhard Bruck and starring Albert Bassermann, Elsa Bassermann, and Bernhard Goetzke.

Cast

References

Bibliography

External links

1920 films
Films of the Weimar Republic
German silent feature films
Films directed by Reinhard Bruck
German black-and-white films
Films based on poems
1920s German films